All Souls College (official name: College of the Souls of All the Faithful Departed) is a constituent college of the University of Oxford in England. Unique to All Souls, all of its members automatically become fellows (i.e., full members of the college's governing body). It has no undergraduate members, but each year, recent graduate and postgraduate students at Oxford are eligible to apply for a small number of examination fellowships through a competitive examination (once described as "the hardest exam in the world") and, for those shortlisted after the examinations, an interview. 

The college entrance is on the north side of High Street, whilst it has a long frontage onto Radcliffe Square. To its east is the Queen's College, whilst Hertford College is to the north of All Souls.

The current warden (head of the college) is Sir John Vickers, a graduate of Oriel College, Oxford.

History
The college was founded by Henry VI of England and Henry Chichele (fellow of New College and Archbishop of Canterbury), in 1438, to commemorate the victims of the Hundred Years' War. The Statutes provided for a warden and forty fellows; all to take Holy Orders: 24 to study arts, philosophy and theology; and 16 to study civil or canon law. 

Today the college is primarily a graduate research institution, with no undergraduate members. All Souls did formerly have undergraduates: Robert Hovenden (Warden of the college from 1571 to 1614) introduced undergraduates to provide the fellows with servientes (household servants), but this was abandoned by the end of the Commonwealth. Four Bible Clerks remained on the foundation until 1924.

For over five hundred years All Souls College admitted only men; women were first allowed to join the college as fellows in 1979, the same year as many other previously all-male colleges in the university.

Buildings and architecture

All Souls College Library

The All Souls College Library (formerly known as the Codrington Library) was founded through a 1710 bequest from Christopher Codrington (1668–1710), a fellow of the college and a wealthy slave and sugar plantation owner. Codrington was an undergraduate at Oxford and later became colonial governor of the Leeward Islands. Christopher Codrington was born in Barbados, and amassed a fortune from his sugar plantation in the West Indies. 

Under the terms of his will Codrington bequeathed books worth £6,000 to the college in addition to £10,000 in currency for the library to be rebuilt and endowed. The new library was completed in 1751 to the designs of Nicholas Hawksmoor and has been in continuous use since then. Today the library comprises some 185,000 items, about a third of which were published before 1800. The collections are particularly strong in law and history (especially military history).

Sir Christopher Wren was a fellow from 1653, and in 1658 produced a sundial for the college. This was originally placed on the south wall of the Chapel, but in 1877 was moved to the quadrangle (above the central entrance to the Codrington Library).

In 2020, the College decided to cease referring to the Library as ‘The Codrington Library’ as part of a set of "steps to address the problematic nature of the Codrington legacy", which comes from wealth derived from slave plantations.

Chapel
Built between 1438 and 1442, the college chapel remained largely unchanged until the Commonwealth. Oxford, having been a largely Royalist stronghold, suffered under the Puritans' wrath. The 42 misericords date from the Chapel's building, and show a resemblance to the misericords at St Mary's Church, Higham Ferrers. Both may have been carved by Richard Tyllock. During the 1660s a screen was installed in the Chapel, which was based on a design by Wren. However, this screen needed to be rebuilt by 1713. By the mid-19th century the Chapel was in great need of renovation, and so the current structure is heavily influenced by Victorian design ideals. There have been a number of rearrangements and repairs of the stained glass windows, but much of the original medieval glass survives.

All services at the chapel are according to the Book of Common Prayer; the King James Bible is also used rather than more modern translations.

Wealth

All Souls is one of the wealthiest colleges in Oxford, with a financial endowment of £420.2 million (2018). However, since the college's principal source of revenue is its endowment and it does not earn income from tuition fees, it only ranked 19th (in 2007) among Oxford colleges in total income. All Souls is a registered charity under English law.

Fellowships

Examination fellowships
In the three years following the award of their bachelor's degrees, students graduating from Oxford and current Oxford postgraduate students having graduated elsewhere are eligible to apply for examination fellowships (sometimes informally referred to as "prize fellowships") of seven years each. While tutors may advise their students to sit for the All Souls examination fellowship, the examination is open to anybody who fulfils the eligibility criteria and the college does not issue invitations to candidates to sit. Every year in early March, the college hosts an open evening for women, offering women interested in the examination fellowship an opportunity to find out more about the exam process and to meet members of the college.

Each year several dozen candidates typically sit the examination. Two examination fellows are usually elected each year, although the college has awarded a single place or three places in some years, and on rare occasions made no award.

The competition, offered since 1878 and open to women since 1979, is held over two days in late September, with two papers of three hours each per day. It has been described in the past as "the hardest exam in the world".

Two papers (the 'specialist papers') are on a single subject of the candidate's choice; the options are classics, English literature, economics, history, law, philosophy, and politics. Candidates may sit their two specialist papers in different specialist subjects, provided each paper is in one subject only (for example, a candidate might sit one paper in History and one paper in Politics). Candidates who choose Classics have an additional translation examination on a third day.

Two papers (the 'general papers') are on general subjects. For each general examination, candidates choose three questions from a list. Past questions have included:
 If a man could say nothing against a character but what he could prove, history could not be written' (Samuel Johnson). Discuss."
 "Should the Orange Prize for Fiction be open to both men and women?"
 "Does the moral character of an orgy change when the participants wear Nazi uniforms?"

Before 2010 candidates also faced another examination, a free-form "Essay" on a single, pre-selected word.

Four to six finalists are invited to a viva voce or oral examination. Previously, these candidates were then invited to dinner with about 75 members of the college. The dinner did not form part of the assessment, but was intended as a reward for those candidates who had reached the latter stages of the selection process. However, the dinner has been discontinued as the college felt candidates worried too often that it was part of the assessment process. 

About a dozen examination fellows are at the college at any one time. There are no compulsory teaching or requirements, although examination fellows must pursue a course of study or research at some point within their first two years of fellowship. They can study anything for free at Oxford with room and board. As "Londoners" they can pursue approved non-academic careers if desired, with a reduced stipend, as long as they pursue academia on a part-time basis and attend weekend dinners at the college during their first academic year.  each examination fellow receives a stipend of £14,842 annually for the first two years; the stipend then varies depending on whether the fellow pursues an academic career.

Notable candidates
Until 1979, women were not permitted to put themselves forward for fellowships at All Souls.

Successful

 Leo Amery (1897), politician
 Sir Isaiah Berlin (1932), philosopher
 George Earle Buckle (1877), journalist
 George Curzon, 1st Marquess Curzon of Kedleston (1883), Viceroy of India
 Geoffrey Dawson (1898), journalist
 Matthew d'Ancona (1989), journalist
 John Gardner (1986), legal philosopher
 Birke Häcker (2001), legal scholar
 Quintin Hogg, Baron Hailsham of St Marylebone (1931), politician and philosopher
 Douglas Jay, Baron Jay (1930), politician
 Richard Jenkyns (1972), classical historian and literary critic
 Keith Joseph, Baron Joseph (1946), politician
 Cosmo Gordon Lang, 1st Baron Lang of Lambeth (1888), Archbishop of Canterbury
 T. E. Lawrence (1919), "Lawrence of Arabia", military officer, writer
M. N. Srinivas, Social anthropologist
 Sir Jeremy Morse, banker
 David Pannick, Baron Pannick (1978), barrister
 Derek Parfit (1974), philosopher
 Sir John Redwood (1972), politician
 A. L. Rowse (1925), historian and poet
 Katherine Rundell (2008), author
 Amia Srinivasan (2009), philosopher
 John Simon, 1st Viscount Simon (1897), politician
 William Waldegrave, Baron Waldegrave of North Hill (1971), politician
 Richard Wilberforce, Baron Wilberforce (1932), jurist
 Sir Bernard Williams (1951), philosopher
 Crispin Wright (1969), philosopher
 Sir John Vickers (1979), economist

Unsuccessful

 Hilaire Belloc (1895), author
 John Buchan, 1st Baron Tweedsmuir (1899), author and Governor General of Canada
 Lord David Cecil, author
 H. L. A. Hart (1929, 1930), philosopher
 Sir William Holdsworth (1897), legal historian
 Harry Mount (1994), journalist
 Ramsay Muir (1897), politician
 Tom Denning, Baron Denning (1923), jurist
 Hugh Trevor-Roper, Baron Dacre of Glanton, historian
 Eric Williams, politician
 Harold Wilson, Baron Wilson of Rievaulx, Prime Minister of the United Kingdom
 Tom Bingham, Baron Bingham of Cornhill, jurist

Subjects of the "Essay"
 "bias"
 "censorship"
 "chaos"
 "charity"
 "comedy"
 "conversion" (1979)
 "corruption"
 "culture" (1914)
 "diversity" (2001)
 "error" (1993)
 "harmony" (2007)
 "innocence" (1964)
 "integrity" (2004)
 "mercy"
 "miracles" (1994)
 "morality"
 "novelty" (2008)
 "originality"
 "possessions" (1925)
 "reproduction" (2009)
 "style" (2005)
 "water" (2006)

Other fellowships
Other categories of fellowship include:
 Senior research fellows (a renewable seven year appointment)
 Extraordinary research fellows (elected to conduct research into the college's history)
 Visiting fellows (academics from other universities, usually elected for a period of one term to one year)
 Post-doctoral research fellows (a non-renewable five year post open to those who have recently completed doctoral study at a recognised university) 
 Fifty-pound fellows (open only to former fellows no longer holding posts in Oxford)
 Official fellows (consisting of holders of college posts, such as the Domestic Bursar, Estates Bursar, Chaplain, and Fellow Librarian) 
 Distinguished fellows

There are also a number of professorial fellows who hold their fellowships by virtue of their University post.

Chichele professorships
Fellows of the college include the Chichele professors, who hold statutory professorships at the University of Oxford named in honour of Henry Chichele, a founder of the college. Fellowship of the college has accompanied the award of a Chichele chair since 1870.

Following the work of the 1850 Commission to examine the organisation of the university, the college suppressed ten of its fellowships to create the funds to establish the first two Chichele professorships: The Chichele Professor of International Law and Diplomacy, established in 1859 and first held by Mountague Bernard, and the Chichele Professor of Modern History, first held by Montagu Burrows.

There are currently Chichele Professorships in five different subjects:
 Chichele Professor of Economic History: Kevin O'Rourke.
 Chichele Professor of the History of War: Peter H. Wilson appointed 2015.
 Chichele Professor of Public International Law: Catherine Redgwell appointed 2012.
 Chichele Professor of Social and Political Theory: Amia Srinivasan appointed 2019.
 Chichele Professor of Medieval History: Julia M. H. Smith, appointed September 2016

Probably the best known former Chichele Professor is Sir Isaiah Berlin. Perhaps the best known former Professor of the History of War was Cyril Falls.

Chichele Lectures
The Chichele Lectures are a prestigious series of lectures formally established in 1912 and sponsored by All Souls College. The lectures were initially restricted to foreign history, but have since been expanded to include law, political theory, economic theory, as well as foreign and British history. Traditionally the lectures were delivered by a single speaker, but it is now common for several speakers to deliver lectures on a common theme.

Customs
Every hundred years, and generally on 14 January, there is a commemorative feast after which the fellows parade around the college with flaming torches, singing the Mallard Song and led by a "Lord Mallard" who is carried in a chair, in search of a legendary mallard that supposedly flew out of the foundations of the college when it was being built. During the hunt the Lord Mallard is preceded by a man bearing a pole to which a mallard is tied – originally a live bird, latterly either dead (1901) or carved from wood (2001). The last mallard ceremony was in 2001 and the next is due in 2101. The precise origin of the custom is not known, but it dates from at least 1632. A benign parody of this custom has been portrayed as the Unseen University's "Megapode chase" in Sir Terry Pratchett's 2009 novel Unseen Academicals.

People associated with All Souls

Fellows

Past and current fellows of the college have included:

 William Emmanuel Abraham
 Leo Amery
 William Reynell Anson
 Andrew Ashworth
 F. W. Bain
 Max Beloff
 Isaiah Berlin
 Margaret Bent
 Tim Besley
 Peter Birks
 Susanne Bobzien
 William Blackstone
 Malcolm Bowie
 Peter Brown
 Julian Bullard
 Myles Burnyeat
 Lionel Butler
 Raymond Carr
 David Caute
 Alasdair Clayre
 Christopher Codrington
 Gerald Cohen
 Peter Conrad
 George Nathaniel Curzon
 Matthew d'Ancona
 David Daube
 David Dilks
 Michael Dummett
 Edward Evan Evans-Pritchard
 Cécile Fabre
 Sheppard Frere
 Diego Gambetta
 John Gardner
 Robert Gascoyne-Cecil, 3rd Marquess of Salisbury
 Robert Gentilis
 Gabriel Gorodetsky
 Birke Häcker
 Ruth Harris
 Andrew Harvey
 Reginald Heber
 Hensley Henson
 Cecilia Heyes
 Rosemary Hill
 Quintin Hogg, Baron Hailsham of St Marylebone
 Christopher Hood
 John Hood (university administrator)
 Roger Hood
 Michael Howard
 Susan Hurley
 E. F. Jacob
 Keith Joseph
 Colin Kidd
 Leszek Kołakowski
 Cosmo Gordon Lang
 T. E. Lawrence
 Edward Chandos Leigh
 Thomas Linacre
 Vaughan Lowe
 Stephen Lushington
 Robert Gwyn Macfarlane
 James Rochfort Maguire
 Noel Malcolm
 John Mason
 Angela McLean
 Catherine Morgan
 Edward Mortimer
 Max Müller
 Patrick Neill, Baron Neill of Bladen
 Brownlow North
 Avner Offer
 David Pannick
 Derek Parfit
 Anthony Quinton
 Sarvepalli Radhakrishnan
 Robert Recorde
 Catherine Redgwell
 John Redwood
 A. L. Rowse
 Katherine Rundell
 Peter Salway
 Andrew Scott
 Graeme Segal
 Amartya Sen
 Catriona Seth
 Patrick Shaw-Stewart
 Gilbert Sheldon
 John Simon, 1st Viscount Simon
 Boudewijn Sirks
 Margareta Steinby
 Alfred C. Stepan
 Joseph E. Stiglitz
 Charles Taylor
 Adam Thirlwell
 Guenter Treitel
 Cecilia Trifogli
 John Vickers
 William Waldegrave, Baron Waldegrave of North Hill
 Kate Warner 
 Marina Warner
 Martin Litchfield West
 Charles Algernon Whitmore
 Richard Wilberforce
 Bernard Williams
 E. F. L. Wood, 1st Earl of Halifax
 Llewellyn Woodward
 Patrick Wormald
 Christopher Wren
 Crispin Wright
 Edward Young
 R. C. Zaehner
 Lucia Zedner

Wardens

Gallery

References

External links

 
 Current Examination Fellows
 Virtual Tour of All Souls College

 
1438 establishments in England
Colleges of the University of Oxford
Educational institutions established in the 15th century
Grade I listed buildings in Oxford
Grade I listed educational buildings
Nicholas Hawksmoor buildings
Buildings and structures of the University of Oxford
Charities based in England
University of Oxford examinations